Ayane Yamazaki (26 January 1999 – ) is a Japanese Pop Music Artist and singer-songwriter. Some critics relate her with city pop, Shibuya-kei and dream pop, although her genre of music is fluid.

Ayane started her musical career around the age of 15 at music venues in Tokyo and Kanagawa. In 2015, she released her first EP Yer from the me and baby music label. The following year, 17-years-old Ayane became the yougest singer-songwriter ever to performe at the Fuji Rock Festival. She made her major label debut from the For Life Music Entertainment in 2017, then her worldwide debut from AWAL in 2019 and received good reputation in the indie music scene.

Dicsography

Notes

References 

 Profiles
 
 

 Interviews
 
 
 
 
 
 
 Other Articles

External links 

 
 

, For Life Music Entertainment

Living people
1999 births
Musicians from Kanagawa Prefecture
Japanese women pop singers
Japanese women singer-songwriters
Japanese singer-songwriters